Torys LLP is a Canadian international corporate law firm with offices in Toronto, Calgary, New York, Montreal and Halifax. The firm acts for a wide range of commercial clients and financial institutions in Canada, the United States, and globally.

History 
The firm was founded in 1941 by Toronto business lawyer John Stewart Donald Tory. In the 1960s the firm was renamed Tory Tory DesLauriers & Binnington. In 2000, it merged with New York law firm Haythe & Curley and was briefly known as Tory Haythe before being rebranded to Torys LLP. Torys became a national firm with the opening of a Calgary office in 2011 and a Montreal office in 2013.

The firm is one of the Seven Sisters, a group of seven prominent Canadian business law firms.

Notable lawyers and alumni
 John Tory, 65th and former Mayor of Toronto, former leader of the Progressive Conservative Party of Ontario, grandson of founder John S. D. Tory
 Robert Prichard, current Chairman of the Bank of Montreal
 Anita Anand, Member of Parliament in the House of Commons of Canada
 Frank Iacobucci, former puisne justice of the Supreme Court of Canada
 John B. Laskin, justice of the Federal Court of Appeal
Robert P. Armstrong, former Justice of the Court of Appeal for Ontario
Bill Davis, former Premier of Ontario

References

External links
Official Website

Law firms of Canada
Law firms established in 1941
Tory family
1941 establishments in Canada